Badr al‐Dīn ʿAbd al‐Wājid (or Wāḥid) ibn Muḥammad ibn Muḥammad al‐Ḥanafī (died 1434) was an Islamic astronomer. He was born in Mashhad, in modern Iran, and died in Kütahya, in modern Turkey, He taught in the Ottoman Demirkapi Madrasa, a school for astronomical observation and instruction. The Demirkapi madrasa was later renamed to the Wājidiyya Madrasa in his honour.

Together with Qutb al-Din al-Shirazi, he brought the influence of the Maragheh observatory to Anatolia.

Works 
  ("A commentary on the Compendium of Astronomy"), a commentary on the work by Jaghmīnī. The commentary was dedicated to Sultan Murād II.
 Sharḥ Sī faṣl, a commentary on Ṭūsī's Persian work of astronomy. Translated into Turkish by Ahmed‐i Dāʿī.
 Maʿālim al‐awqāt wa‐sharḥuhu, a work in the use of astrolabe written in verse using 552 couplets. Dedicated to Muḥammad Shāh (d. 1406), the son of al‐Fanārī (d. 1431).

References

Sources
  (PDF version)

Year of birth unknown
1434 deaths
People from Mashhad
Astronomers of the medieval Islamic world
15th-century astronomers